The Kit Carson Scouts (also known as Tiger Scouts or Lực Lượng 66) belonged to a special program initially created by the U.S. Marine Corps during the Vietnam War involving the use of former Viet Cong (VC) and People's Army of Vietnam (PAVN) personnel as intelligence scouts for American infantry units. VC and PAVN combatants who defected and became aligned with the South Vietnamese government were known as Chiêu Hồi or Hồi Chánh Viên, the latter being a term loosely translated as "members who have returned to the righteous side". Only a very small number of these Chiêu Hồi were selected, trained, and deployed with the U.S. Marines and later also other American and Allied (non-Vietnamese) infantry units between 1966 and 1972.

Background

Most Hồi Chánh Viên recruited into the fledgling Kit Carson Scout program had defected to Saigon's side in the war because they suffered either from malaria or grave wounds beyond what could be medically treated with the rudimentary medical care available on the VC/PAVN side. Those who volunteered for selection and training as Kit Carson Scouts had, during their service with the enemy, little or no contact with anyone speaking English. Few had any knowledge at all of the English language, creating a communication challenge as they were deployed with American units. A further complication was that almost all Hồi Chánh Viên had a distrust of South Vietnamese soldiers and interpreters because of the degree to which friendly forces had been infiltrated by enemy agents. As the program evolved, recruitment of non-military VC cadre and defecting PAVN officers were added, and these Kit Carson Scouts also became valuable sources of intelligence in the conduct of the war.

History

The concept of using soldiers who had previously fought on the enemy side in this way originated in late 1966 with the 5th Counterintelligence Team, which had counterintelligence tasks within the Da Nang Chiêu Hồi Center as one responsibility. Major General Herman Nickerson Jr., commanding the 1st Marine Division at the time, named them Kit Carson Scouts after Kit Carson the American frontiersman.

The first six Kit Carson Scouts were placed in the field with the 1st and 9th Marine Regiments as part of a trial program in October 1966. All but one of the original group of six would later be killed in action. The VC defectors initially recruited to work as intelligence scouts with U.S. Marine infantry units were paid by the U.S. military and were treated as staff non-commissioned officers with a nominal rank (not official) of staff sergeant.

From October to December 1966, III Marine Amphibious Force (III MAF) credited Kit Carson Scouts with killing 47 VC, recovering 16 weapons and discovering 18 mines and tunnels. By the end of 1966, 19 scouts were serving with the 1st Marine Division. By the end of 1967, the 132 Scouts serving with the Marines in I Corps were credited with killing 58 more VC, capturing 37 and recovering 82 weapons. General Lewis William Walt ordered the program to be adopted throughout III MAF and a Kit Carson training center was established at Da Nang to standardize training.

On 29 April 1967, the Intelligence Section of the Military Assistance Command, Vietnam (MACV) published a procedural document detailing the expansion of the Kit Carson Scout Program for all active U.S. Army units in the country, including the scout's terms of service and wages. In September 1967, General William Westmoreland issued an order directing all infantry divisions in Vietnam, including U.S. Army units, to begin using Kit Carson Scouts in conjunction with friendly operations. He directed that a minimum of 100 scouts per division was necessary to ensure effectiveness with a target of 1,500 scouts by the end of 1968.

In 1968, the number of scouts increased from 132 to 476, with 102 serving with the 1st Marine Division, 106 with the 3rd Marine Division, 153 with the 101st Airborne Division, and 115 with the 23rd Infantry Division, with a further 22 undergoing training. Throughout the year, scouts were credited with killing 312 VC/PAVN, apprehending 851 suspects as well as locating 720 tunnels and supply caches and over 1,300 booby-traps.

During 1969, the number of scouts working with III MAF grew from 476 to 597 despite the redeployment of the 3rd Marine Division during the year. The scouts were credited with killing 191 VC/PAVN, capturing 539 and recovering 195 weapons, and locating 143 tunnels and caches and 518 booby-traps. In January 1969, scouts began being assigned to Allied forces, starting with the 1st Australian Task Force, followed by the Royal Thai Army Expeditionary Division in August 1969 and South Korean forces in December 1970.

At the beginning of 1970, over 2,300 scouts served with U.S. forces, with 165 serving in the III MAF. III MAF recruited potential scouts from Chiêu Hồi centers in Da Nang and Hoi An. An experienced Marine NCO investigated the background of motivation of each potential recruit and those who passed would then go to a training center west of Danang for 28 days of training and evaluation. Class sizes were small, usually consisting of no more than eight men. Training including fieldcraft, field sketching, use of sensors and basic English. As the Marines redeployed from South Vietnam the number of scouts serving with III MAF dropped to 111 in July and 95 in December. During 1970, III MAF scouts were credited with killing 43 VC, capturing 313 and recovering 96 weapons.

A report given to the U.S. Senate Foreign Relations Committee in February 1970 listed 230 Kit Carson Scouts killed in action and 716 wounded.In June 1970, as part of the Vietnamization program, the Kit Carson Program name was changed to Lực Lượng 66 (Vietnamese for Force 66), but scout numbers declined as U.S. forces withdrew from South Vietnam with only 400 scouts serving by the end of 1970.

References

Further reading
 Quiroga, Stefan Aguirre. "Phan Chot’s Choice: Agency and Motivation among the Kit Carson Scouts during the Vietnam War, 1966–1973," War and Society 39#2 (2020) pp.  126-143,

Indigenous counterinsurgency forces
Military units and formations established in 1966
Military units and formations of the United States in the Vietnam War
Military units and formations of the United States Marine Corps in the Vietnam War
Viet Cong